Arawat Sabejew (born 24 September 1968) is a Soviet-German Freestyle wrestler. He won a bronze medal at the 1996 Summer Olympics. Sabejew was also a two-time World Championships medalist, winning gold in 1994 and silver in 1995.

References

External links
 

1968 births
Living people
People from Petropavl
German male sport wrestlers
Olympic wrestlers of Germany
Wrestlers at the 1996 Summer Olympics
Wrestlers at the 2000 Summer Olympics
Olympic bronze medalists for Germany
Olympic medalists in wrestling
Medalists at the 1996 Summer Olympics
World Wrestling Championships medalists
Kazakhstani emigrants to Germany
Kazakhstani male sport wrestlers
Soviet male sport wrestlers
Soviet emigrants to Germany
Volga German diaspora
European Wrestling Championships medalists
World Wrestling Champions